Zombo may refer to:

Zombo, Angola, a town in Uíge Province in Angola
Zombo District, a district in West Nile sub-region, Northern Uganda
Zombo, Uganda, the largest town in Zombo District and the location of the district headquarters.
Zombo (comics), a 2000 AD story
Zombo (singer) (1979–2008), a South African musician
Zombo.com, a website consisting of a Flash animation

Surname
Frank Zombo (born 1987), an American football linebacker
Rick Zombo (born 1963), a retired American ice hockey defenseman